Backstreet's Back Tour was a concert tour by the Backstreet Boys that began in 1997 and concluded in 1998. It was also the first tour to be held all over the United States. The set list included songs from their second album Backstreet's Back (International) (1997) and several songs from their debut U.S. album, Backstreet Boys (U.S.) (1997). 

During this tour, Backstreet Boys member Brian Littrell underwent surgery to correct a congenital heart defect he had had since birth. Surgery was necessary because the hole in his heart was getting larger. The group postponed a couple of show dates but Littrell was back performing with the group within weeks after the surgery only to have oxygen tanks in the wings of the stage.

Opening acts
Emjay  (December 27-January 7)
Los Umbrellos (January 14-February 1, select dates)
Westlife (March 17-March 18)
Solid HarmoniE (March 17-March 22)
Thomas Jules-Stock (March 24-April 15, select dates)
N-Tyce (March 24-April 15, select dates)
Aaron Carter (July 8-September 15)
Jimmy Ray (July 8-September 15, select dates)
S.O.A.P. (July 8-September 15, select dates)
Chris Durán (September 18–19)
INOJ (November 18–19)
LFO (December 30–31)

Setlist

Notes:
indicates that they were performed in other parts of the tour
indicates that it was on the 'Homecoming: Live In Concert' show

Performance Notes:
"Party Like It's 1999" was also performed as the Encore during the 'Homecoming: Live In Concert' show but not featured on the live recording.

Tour dates

Festivals and other miscellaneous performances

South Florida Fair
Jam at Nease
Festival Internacional de la Canción de Viña del Mar
Orlando Bands Together
Radio Regenbogen Party
VIVA Unplugged '98

Grad Nite
Kiss 108 Party
Great New York State Fair
Champlain Valley Fair
Allegan County Fair
York Fair

Cancellations and rescheduled shows

Personnel
Lead Vocals: Kevin Richardson, Brian Littrell, Howie Dorough, Nick Carter, AJ McLean
Tour Director: 
Tour Manager: Paul 'Skip' Rickert
Assistant Tour Manager: Tim Krieg
Co-Director: Denise McLean
Co-Director: Nicole Peltz
Press Liaison: Leila Eminson
Tour Accountant: Vincent Corry
Staff Photographer: Andre Csillig
Musical Director: William 'Bubba' Bryant
Costume Design: Jill Focke, Kerstin 'Kiki' Theileis, Janine Schreiber
Choreographer: Fatima Robinson**
Assistant Choreographer: Richard "Swoop" Whitebear

Security
Billy Evans: Nick's Security
Tom LeBrun: Head of Security/Brian's Security
Marc Preston: Howie's Security
Marcus Johnson: AJ's Security
Carlos Cardenas: Kevin's Security
John "Q" Elgani: Security

Band
Keyboards & Synthesizers: Tommy Smith
Electric & Acoustic Guitar: Billy Chapin
Keyboards / Acoustic Guitar: Dennis Gallo
Percussion / Saxophone: Obie Morant
Bass Guitar & Synth Bass: Freddy Mollings
Drums & Percussion: Tim Berkible

References

1997 concert tours
1998 concert tours
Backstreet Boys concert tours